Piotr Leciejewski (born 23 March 1985) is a Polish professional football goalkeeper who plays for MKP Wołów.

Career

Club
He impressed instantly with his explosive reflexes, and was one of Sogndal's best players when he arrived. In the 2010 season he saved 5 out of 5 penalties.

On 19 August 2010, rumors claimed that English champions Chelsea were interested in the Polish keeper.

Leciejewski moved from Sogndal to Brann after the 2010-season, in an exchange-deal where Kenneth Udjus and Cato Hansen moved the other way. He made his debut for Brann in the fifth league-match of the 2011-season against Molde, and despite conceding three goals in his debut, Leciejewski soon displaced Håkon Opdal, Brann's first-choice goalkeeper since 2004 Leciejewski quickly became a fan favorite at Brann, and was awarded with the supporters Player of the Year-award in both the 2012- and 2013-season.

On 3 November 2011, Leciejewski stated that he might be interested in playing for Norway national football team.

Career statistics

References

External links
 

1985 births
Living people
People from Legnica
Polish footballers
Association football goalkeepers
Górnik Zabrze players
GKS Katowice players
Górnik Łęczna players
Korona Kielce players
ŁKS Łódź players
Sogndal Fotball players
SK Brann players
Norwegian First Division players
Eliteserien players
Polish expatriate footballers
Expatriate footballers in Norway
Polish expatriate sportspeople in Norway
Sportspeople from Lower Silesian Voivodeship